Salaakhen (lock up) is a 1998 Indian Hindi-language action film directed by Guddu Dhanoa. It stars  Sunny Deol and Raveena Tandon in pivotal roles.

Plot
The film starts with scenes in which police is in search of Vishal Agnihotri who is killer of four prominent personalities of the city. Suddenly, Vishal comes on the scene talking with a prominent lawyer. He deals with the lawyer to prove him innocent in the court for Rs.100 million. According to the deal, the lawyer proves Vishal innocent by presenting wrong witnesses wrongfully. When judge is about to announce the decision, Vishal kills his lawyer and accepts his guilt of killing four people. The news spreads on media like a forest fire. An inquiry committee was constituted to see other side of picture in Vishal's case. Vishal appears before the committee and film goes back flash which was Akandivli-based Sachidanand Agnihotri is an honest school-teacher, who has always faced problems due to his honesty, first with Poornima School; then in a Government school, and now he has come forward to testify against the sexual assault and murder of a young woman from Worli. Sachidanand points an accusing finger at Nagesh, the son of prominent and influential Jaspal Rana. Sachidanand's family, which consists of his wife, Gayetri, and son, Vishal, attempt in vain to talk him out of testifying. Vishal falls in love with Neha. The Police are forced to arrest Nagesh and hold him in a cell. Then the Police, headed by a corrupt Assistant Commissioner of Police, Kamble, attempt to intimidate Sachidanand and follow him everywhere under the pretext of protection. Sachidanand is driven out of his mind, and on the day of the testimony, Nagesh's lawyer, Ashok Pradhan, confuses him to such an extent that Sachidanand kills himself. Vishal, who is being held in prison for assaulting several policemen, breaks out, abducts Nagesh, and then kills Ashok Pradhan. When Kamble comes to Nagesh's rescue, Vishal kills both of them. He then hunts down Jaspal Rana and eventually kills him. The film comes in present. After listening Vishal's story, the court hands Vishal a sentence of 3 years to life imprisonment for which he tells the judge not to appoint people like Jaspal Rana to be ministers so people like him would have to take the law into their own hands.

Cast
 Sunny Deol as Vishal S. Agnihotri
 Raveena Tandon as Neha G. Rao
 Anupam Kher as Sachidanand Agnihotri
 Farida Jalal as Gayatri S. Agnihotri
 Amrish Puri as Jaspal Rana
 Mahavir Shah as ACP Kamble 
 Mohan Joshi as Advocate Ashok Pradhan
 Deven Verma as Giri Rao
 Dinesh Hingoo as Badri
 Harish Patel as Banteshwar
 Ravi Patwardhan as Advocate Khurana 
 Manisha Koirala as an item number "Pichhu Pade Hai"

Soundtrack

References

External links

1990s Hindi-language films
1998 films
Films shot in Mumbai
Films shot in Switzerland
Films scored by Dilip Sen-Sameer Sen
Indian action films
1990s masala films
Indian films about revenge
Indian courtroom films
1998 action films
Hindi-language action films
Films directed by Guddu Dhanoa